Amy Yamazaki is a British actress best known for her portrayal of Charlotte Lau in the long-running Channel 4 soap opera Hollyoaks.

Career
Yamazaki began acting when she was ten years old. She made her on-screen acting debut in BBC medical drama Holby City in 2001. Since then, she has appeared in television show such as CBBC's Powers, BBC Three's Marigold and she also appeared in the pilot episode of BBC Three comedy Coming of Age as one of the lead characters Jas.

In 2009, Yamazaki began playing lesbian student Charlotte Lau in Channel 4 soap opera Hollyoaks. In 2010, Yamazaki left Hollyoaks after a year in the show.

References

External links

1991 births
Living people
British soap opera actresses
English people of Japanese descent
English soap opera actresses
Actresses of Japanese descent
British actresses of Japanese descent